The Legislative Assembly of Amur Oblast, previously the Council of People's Deputies of Amur Oblast until 2008, is the regional parliament of Amur Oblast, a federal subject of Russia. A total of 27 deputies are elected for five-year terms.

Elections

2021

Composition

Committees 

 Committee on the budget, taxes, economy and area property
 Committee on questions of an agrarian policy, environmental management and ecology
 Committee on questions of the legislation, local government and to regulations
 Committee on questions of social policy

Notes

References

External links 
 official site of LA

Politics of Amur Oblast
Amur Oblast
Amur Oblast
1994 establishments in Russia